The 2015–16 SV Darmstadt 98 season is the club's 118th season. This will be the club's third season in the Bundesliga overall and its first since its most recent promotion.

Background
Darmstadt 98 will be playing in their 118th overall season, and third overall in the top-flight Bundesliga, after they were promoted following a 1–0 win over FC St. Pauli on the final matchday of the 2014–15 2. Bundesliga season. This is their second-straight promotion after they were promoted from the 3. Liga the previous year. The promotion finished a 33-year run outside of top-flight football. They had previously played in the Bundesliga in the 1978–79 and 1981–82 seasons.

Friendlies

Pre-season

Mid-season

Competitions

Bundesliga

League table

Results summary

Results by round

Matches

DFB-Pokal

Squad

Squad

Squad and statistics

|}

Transfers

In

Out

References

SV Darmstadt 98 seasons
Darmstadt